Bryce Williams (born 14 April 1980 in Dargaville, New Zealand) is a former rugby union player who played for Northland in the ITM Cup competition.

Playing career
Williams spent five seasons with Auckland and played briefly in Super Rugby for the Blues and Crusaders. He moved to Europe in 2005, spending a season with Leinster in the Celtic League and five seasons with Bourgoin in the French Top 14.

Williams returned to New Zealand in 2011, signing with Northland for the 2011 ITM Cup and continued as a squad regular before retiring in 2014.

References

External links
Blues Profile

1980 births
Living people
Auckland rugby union players
Blues (Super Rugby) players
Crusaders (rugby union) players
CS Bourgoin-Jallieu players
Expatriate rugby union players in France
Expatriate rugby union players in Ireland
Leinster Rugby players
New Zealand expatriate rugby union players
New Zealand expatriate sportspeople in France
New Zealand expatriate sportspeople in Ireland
New Zealand rugby union players
Northland rugby union players
Rugby union locks
Rugby union players from Dargaville